Seth Jarvis (born February 1, 2002) is a Canadian professional ice hockey centre for the Carolina Hurricanes of the National Hockey League (NHL). Jarvis was selected 13th overall by the Hurricanes in the 2020 NHL Entry Draft.

Early life
Jarvis was born on February 1, 2002, in Winnipeg to parents Ray and Tracey. Growing up, Jarvis played with the Tuxedo Lightning, Assiniboine Park Rangers, and the Winnipeg Monarchs.

Playing career
On October 6, 2020, Jarvis was selected by the Carolina Hurricanes with the 13th overall pick in the 2020 NHL Entry Draft. On December 28, Jarvis signed a three-year, entry-level contract with the Hurricanes.

Jarvis eventually made his NHL debut on October 31, 2021, where he also recorded his first point. On November 3, Jarvis scored his first career NHL goal against the Chicago Blackhawks. Jarvis ended the season with 17 goals and 23 assists for 40 points in 68 games played.

On February 16, 2023, Jarvis recorded his first career hat trick in a 6–2 victory against the Montreal Canadiens.

Career statistics

Regular season and playoffs

International

References

External links
 

2002 births
Living people
Canadian ice hockey centres
Carolina Hurricanes draft picks
Carolina Hurricanes players
Chicago Wolves players
Ice hockey people from Manitoba
National Hockey League first-round draft picks
Portland Winterhawks players